Legacy+ is a 2021 double album by Femi Kuti and Made Kuti. The album is made up of Femi Kuti's Stop the Hate and Made Kuti's For(e)ward. It was released on 5 February 2021.

Background
The title represents a tribute to Fela Kuti as the pioneering afrobeat musician and also to the future of afrobeat music in general. It has also been referred to as an immortalisation of Fela Kuti and the afrobeat genre. Femi Kuti's Stop the Hate album occupies the first 10 tracks of the album while Made Kuti's For(e)ward album occupies the last 8 tracks. The cover art is a portrait art of Femi Kuti and Made Kuti by Delphine Desane.

Femi Kuti's 10th studio album, Stop the Hate is described as a sociopolitical recording which proffers solutions to perennial problems highlighted in his previous recordings. He encourages youth participation in politics and urges a quick resolution to problems. 

Made Kuti's For(e)ward adresses national unity, sexual harassment as well as issues relating to police brutality and End SARS. He also chronicles how Nigeria's problems have remained the same since the 1970s. 

The music video for Femi Kuti's "As We Struggle Everyday" was released on the same day as the album release. The video was filmed by Optimus Dammy, edited by Audrey Hurtis, and illustrated by Kiki Picasso.

Production and release
The album was produced by Sodi Marciszewer who had worked with Fela Kuti in the past and was released under Partisan Records. All the instrumentats on For(e)ward were composed, arranged and played by Made Kuti.

Tracklist

Reception

A reviewer for The Guardian noted that Femi Kuti's Stop the Hate is "an unremarkable continuation of the Afrobeat canon" and serves as a springboard for Made Kuti's For(e)ward. It was then rated 4 stars out of 5. The album was rated 7.7/10 by a Pulse Nigeria reviewer who said "it’s another accomplished show of musicianship - as you would expect from a coalition of the Kutis on a ‘Legacy’ project." A reviewer for The Quietus described the album as afrobeat being adapted for a "western palette".

Awards and nominations

References

2021 albums
Nigerian music
Femi Kuti albums
Afrobeat albums